Cymiazole is a veterinary drug used as an ectoparasiticide.  It is also used to control Varroa mites in honeybees.

References

Veterinary drugs
Antiparasitic agents
Imines
Thiazolines